Joseph Son may refer to:
Joseph Son Sam-seok (born 1955), South Korean Roman Catholic bishop
Joe Son (Joseph Hyungmin Son, born 1970), American former mixed martial artist and convicted felon

See also
Josephson, a surname
Joe Sun (born 1943), American country music singer
Joseph Sun (disambiguation)